The crab-eating mongoose (Urva urva) is a mongoose species ranging from the northeastern Indian subcontinent and Southeast Asia to southern China and Taiwan. It is listed as Least Concern on the IUCN Red List.

Taxonomy 
Gulo urva was the scientific name introduced by Brian Houghton Hodgson in 1836 who first described the type specimen that originated in central Nepal. It was later classified in the genus Herpestes, but all Asian mongooses are now thought to belong in the genus Urva, of which U. urva is the type species.

Characteristics

The crab-eating mongoose is grey on the sides and dusky brown on neck, chest, belly and limbs. It has a broad white stripe on the sides of the neck extending from the cheeks to the shoulder.
It has white specks on the top of the head, its chin is white and its throat gray. Its iris is yellow. Its ears are short and rounded. It has webs between the digits.

Distribution and habitat
The crab-eating mongoose occurs in northeastern India, northern Myanmar, Thailand, Peninsular Malaysia, Laos, Cambodia, and Vietnam. It is rare in Bangladesh.

In Nepal, it inhabits subtropical evergreen and moist deciduous forests, and has also been observed on agricultural land near human settlements.
In India, it was recorded in Assam and Arunachal Pradesh.
In Bangladesh, it was recorded in the eastern forested hills in Sylhet and Chittagong areas.
In Myanmar, it was recorded in the Bumhpa Bum hills at up to  altitude, in Hukawng Valley, Alaungdaw Kathapa National Park, Bago Yoma and Myinmoletkat Taung during surveys between 2001 and 2003.
In China's Guangxi, Guangdong and Hainan provinces, it was recorded in subtropical limestone forest during interview and camera-trapping surveys carried out between 1997 and 2005.

Ecology and behaviour
Crab-eating mongooses are usually active in the mornings and evenings, and were observed in groups of up to four individuals. They are supposed to be good swimmers, and hunt along the banks of streams and close to water.

Despite their common name, their diet consists not only of crabs, but also just about anything else they can catch, including fish, snails, frogs, rodents, birds, reptiles, and insects.

Conservation
Urva urva is listed in CITES Appendix III.

References

Further reading
Menon, V. (2003). A field guide to Indian mammals. Penguin India, New Delhi

External links

Urva (genus)
Mammals of Bangladesh
Mammals of Myanmar
Mammals of Cambodia
Mammals of China
Mammals of India
Mammals of Laos
Carnivorans of Malaysia
Mammals of Nepal
Mammals of Taiwan
Mammals of Thailand
Mammals of Vietnam
Mammals of Southeast Asia
Mammals described in 1836
Taxobox binomials not recognized by IUCN